Lindsay Custodio-Cale (born 22 October 1978) is a Filipino actress and singer.

Career 

Custodio was cast in the youth-oriented variety show “Ang TV.”  in 1992.

In 1995, she was cast in the romantic dance film Hataw Na.

Custodio appeared in the films Kristo and Ang TV: The Adarna Adventure in 1996. In the same year, her debut album My First was released.

Her second album New Horizons was released in 1998.

Personal life 
Custodio was married to Tanauan, Batangas vice mayor Julius Caesar Platon from December 2000 until his death in November 2018, with whom she has two children. Sean Christopher and Charisse Marianne.
She was also a Traditional Catholic. (SSPX) Oldest sister of John Vernon Custodio and working as RTA at ResultsCX Rai campus located at barangay ugong ortigas Cor, Pasig, City yehey

Filmography

Television

Film

Discography

Studio albums

Guest appearances

References

External links 
 

Living people
Star Magic
1978 births